Leptobarbus is a genus of cyprinid fish that are native to freshwater habitats in Southeast Asia. They are important food fish. It is the only genus in the subfamily Leptobarbinae. Leptobarbus hoevenii or "sultan fish" migrate the fresh water rivers of Malaysia and travel at the surface in schools of 40-80 individuals at speeds of 0.48-1.08 km. Acid-soluble collagen (ASC) and pepsin-soluble collagen (PSC) were extracted from the muscles of selected cultured catfish (hybrid of Clarias gariepinus x Clarias macrocephalus), red tilapia (Oreochromis niloticus), black tilapia (Oreochromis mossambicus), pangasius catfish (Pangasianodon hypopthalmus), sultan fish (Leptobarbus hoevenii) and labyrinth fish (Trichogaster trichopterus), freshwater fishes that are widely consumed in Malaysia. The extracted yields for the tested species were higher for PSC as compared with ASC.

Species 
 Leptobarbus hoevenii (Bleeker, 1851) (Hoven's carp, Mad barb, Sultan fish)
 Leptobarbus hosii (Regan, 1906)
 Leptobarbus melanopterus M. C. W. Weber & de Beaufort, 1916
 Leptobarbus melanotaenia Boulenger, 1894
 Leptobarbus rubripinna (Fowler, 1937)

References

 
Cyprinid fish of Asia
Barbs (fish)
Cyprinidae genera